The 1987 NCAA Division II men's basketball tournament involved 32 schools playing in a single-elimination tournament to determine the national champion of men's NCAA Division II college basketball as a culmination of the 1986–87 NCAA Division II men's basketball season. It was won by Kentucky Wesleyan College, with Kentucky Wesleyan's Sam Smith named the Most Outstanding Player.

Regional participants

*denotes tie

Regionals

New England - Manchester, New Hampshire 
Location: NHC Fieldhouse Host: New Hampshire College

Third Place - St. Anselm 94, New Haven 88

East - Erie, Pennsylvania 
Location: Hammermill Center Host: Gannon University

Third Place - C.W. Post 85, St. Michael's 72

South - Lakeland, Florida 
Location: Jenkins Field House Host: Florida Southern College

Third Place - Tampa 92, Alabama A&M 76

West - Billings, Montana 
Location: Alterowitz Gym Host: Eastern Montana College

Third Place - Cal State Hayward 71, Cal State Dominguez Hills 55

North Central - St. Cloud, Minnesota 
Location: Halenbeck Hall Host: St. Cloud State University

Third Place - Lock Haven 84, Wayne State 83

South Central - Amarillo, Texas 
Location: Amarillo Civic Center Host: West Texas State University

Third Place - West Texas State 67, Abilene Christian 63

South Atlantic - Norfolk, Virginia 
Location: Joseph G. Echols Memorial Hall Host: Norfolk State University

Third Place - Virginia Union 99, UDC 92

Great Lakes - Owensboro, Kentucky 
Location: Owensboro Sportscenter Host: Kentucky Wesleyan College

Third Place - Southern Indiana 102, Johnson C. Smith 96

*denotes each overtime played

National Quarterfinals

National Finals - Springfield, Massachusetts
Location: Springfield Civic Center Hosts: American International College and Springfield College

*denotes each overtime played

All-tournament team
 Jerome Johnson (Eastern Montana)
 Mike Runski (Gannon)
 Sam Smith (Kentucky Wesleyan)
 Andra Whitlow (Kentucky Wesleyan)
 John Worth (Kentucky Wesleyan)

See also
1987 NCAA Division I men's basketball tournament
1987 NCAA Division III men's basketball tournament
1987 NAIA men's basketball tournament
1987 NCAA Division II women's basketball tournament

References

Sources
 2010 NCAA Men's Basketball Championship Tournament Records and Statistics: Division II men's basketball Championship
 1987 NCAA Division II men's basketball tournament jonfmorse.com

NCAA Division II men's basketball tournament
Tournament
NCAA Division II basketball tournament
NCAA Division II basketball tournament
Basketball in Amarillo, Texas